Prism is an album by American pianist Joanne Brackeen recorded in 1978 and released on the Choice label before being rereleased on CD on Candid in 2003.

Reception 

AllMusic reviewer Scott Yanow stated "Prism is a set of piano-bass duets with Eddie Gómez. As usual for the era, all of the compositions are Brackeen's, and the music is both challenging and spontaneous, at least for musicians skilled enough to master the structures. Although underrated, Brackeen has long been one of the giants of modal post-bop piano, and this fine set serves as additional proof".

Track listing 
All compositions by Joanne Brackeen.

 "International Festival" – 7:05
 "Lost or Found" – 6:17
 "Golden Garden" – 8:40
 "Habitat" – 5:56
 "If You Dare" – 4:05
 "Evanescent" – 5:33
 "Prism" – 5:04
 "International Festival" [alternate take] – 7:15  Bonus track on CD release

Personnel 
Joanne Brackeen – piano
Eddie Gómez – bass

References 

Joanne Brackeen albums
1979 albums
Candid Records albums